Dionysios "Sakis" Tataris (alternate spelling: Dionysis) (born February 5, 1998) is a Greek professional basketball player for Koroivos Amaliadas of the Greek A2 Basket League. He is a 2.05 m (6' 8") tall and 113 kg (250 lb.) power forward-center.

Professional career
Tataris began his professional career in 2015, with the Greek Basket League club Apollon Patras. He signed with the Greek First Division club Aris, in 2016, and was then loaned by them to the Greek 2nd Division club Machites Doxas Pefkon.

On September 16, 2017, he was loaned to Aries Trikala of the Greek Basket League.

Greek national team
Tataris has been a member of the Greek junior national teams. With Greece's junior national teams, he played at the 2014 FIBA Europe Under-16 Championship, the 2016 FIBA Europe Under-18 Championship, and the 2017 FIBA Europe Under-20 Championship. He also played at the 2017 FIBA Europe Under-20 Championship, where he won a gold medal.

References

External links
FIBA Archive Profile
FIBA Europe Profile 
Draftexpress.com Profile
Eurobasket.com Profile
Greek Basket League Profile 
Greek Basket League Profile 

1998 births
Living people
Apollon Patras B.C. players
Aries Trikala B.C. players
Centers (basketball)
Greek men's basketball players
Machites Doxas Pefkon B.C. players
Power forwards (basketball)
Basketball players from Patras